Prodelaca is a genus of moths of the family Oecophoridae.

Species
Prodelaca achalinella (Meyrick, 1883)
Prodelaca biseriata (Meyrick, 1920)
Prodelaca eocrossa (Meyrick, 1888)
Prodelaca leptochroma (Turner, 1937)
Prodelaca limata (Meyrick, 1914)
Prodelaca micropasta (Turner, 1944)
Prodelaca myodes (Meyrick, 1883)
Prodelaca puellaris (Meyrick, 1883)

References

Markku Savela's ftp.funet.fi

 
Oecophorinae
Moth genera